Eka Peksha Ek is an Indian television dance reality show in Marathi language originally aired on Zee Marathi. It was hosted by Aadesh Bandekar and Pushkar Shrotri. Sachin Pilgaonkar was the producer and Mahaguru (main judge) of this show. It aired from 26 December 2007 and stopped on 13 October 2013 with seven seasons.

Seasons

Awards

References 

Zee Marathi original programming
Marathi-language television shows
Indian reality television series
2007 Indian television series debuts
2013 Indian television series endings